P. A. Thomas (22 March 1922 – 19 January 1995) was an Indian film director, producer, script writer, theater artist and actor in Malayalam movies. He has directed more than 15 movies and produced 11 movies  during the 1960s and 1970s. He has also acted around 20 movies. Some of the popular movies he produced are Oraal Koodi Kallanaayi  (1964), Kudumbini (1964), Porter Kunjali (1965), Station Master (1967) and Thomasleeha (1975). All his movies dealt with the contemporary social issues of those times.

Career
After passing the intermediate course, Thomas entered professional drama troupe as an actor. He later formed his own professional drama troupe and presented several dramas all over Kerala and in other parts of India. He was offered a role in the 1950 film Prasanna  which was directed by Sri Ramadu Naidu and  next  year in 1951 he became the hero of Vanamala film which was directed by Dr.G.Viswanath. Vanamala which was released in 1951 was the first jungle film in Malayalam. He later entered to the field of direction also and directed several successful films in Malayalam. Thomas himself was the producer of many films which he directed.

Personal life and death
Thomas was born in Puthanangadi family to Abraham and Mariamma on 22 March 1922 at Njarakkal.

He was married to Thresia and had 3 children. Thomas died on 19 January 1995, at the age of 72.

Filmography

Direction
 Sreekovil (1962)
 Oraal Koodi Kallanaayi (1964)
 Kudumbini (1964)
 Bhoomiyile Malakha (1965)
 Porter Kunjali (1965)
 Kayamkulam Kochunni (1966)
 Kallippennu (1966)
 Station Master (1966)
 Jeevikkan Anuvadikku (1967)
 Paavappettaval (1967)
 Postman (1967)
 Madatharuvi (1967)
 Sahadharmini (1967)
 Thalaivan (1970) (Tamil)
 Jesus (1973)
 Thomasleeha (1975)

Acting
 Prasanna (1950)
 Vanamaala (1951)
 Kaanchana (1952)
 Malaikkallan (1954)
 Manasaakshi (1954)
 Thaskaraveeran (1957)
 Chathurangam (1959)
 Naadodikal (1959)
 Mudiyanaaya Puthran (1961)
 Sreekovil (1962)
 Veluthambi Dalawa (1962)
 Oraal Koodi Kallanaayi (1964)
 Kudumbini (1964)
 Kalyaana Photo (1964)
 Thacholi Othenan (1964)
 Porter Kunjali (1965)
 Aruthu (1976)
 Nizhal Moodiya Nirangal (1983)

Production
 Oraal Koodi Kallanaayi (1964)
 Kudumbini (1964)
 Bhoomiyile Maalakha (1965)
 Porter Kunjaali (1965)
 Kallippennu (1966)
 Station Master (1966)
 Postman (1967)
 Maadatharuvi (1967)
 Sahadharmini (1967)
 Thomasleeha (1975)
 Nizhal Moodiya Nirangal (1983)

Screenplay
 Postman (1967)
 Jesus (1973)
 Anuraagam (2002)

Story
 Kallippennu (1966)
 Postman (1967)
 Sahadharmini (1967)

Dialogue
 Anuraagam (2002; posthumous adaptation)

References

External links

1922 births
1995 deaths
20th-century Indian dramatists and playwrights
20th-century Indian film directors
20th-century Indian male actors
Malayalam film directors
Malayalam screenwriters
Malayalam film producers
Male actors from Thiruvananthapuram
Male actors in Malayalam cinema
Indian male film actors
Film directors from Thiruvananthapuram
Film producers from Thiruvananthapuram
Screenwriters from Thiruvananthapuram